Cantharidus rariguttatus is a species of sea snail, a marine gastropod mollusk in the family Trochidae, the top snails. 

This is a taxon inquirendum.

Description
The height of an adult shell attains 10 mm.

Distribution
This marine species occurs off the Philippines.

References

External links
 Gastropods.com: Thalotia rariguttata
 Sowerby, G. B. III. (1916). Descriptions of seven new species of Mollusca belonging to the genera Drillia, Clavatula, Epitonium, Cantharidus, Bittium, Fissurella, and Cardium. Proceedings of the Malacological Society of London. 12 (2-3): 74–76, pl. 3
 Petit, R. E. (2009). George Brettingham Sowerby, I, II & III: their conchological publications and molluscan taxa. Zootaxa. 2189: 1–218

rariguttatus
Gastropods described in 1916